Shahneh (also Romanized as Shaḩneh or Sheḩneh) is a village in, and the capital of, Fajr Rural District of the Central District of Yazd County, Yazd province, Iran. At the 2006 National Census, its population was 878 in 241 households. The following census in 2011 counted 894 people in 270 households. The latest census in 2016 showed a population of 1,171 people in 359 households; it was the largest village in its rural district.

References 

Yazd County

Populated places in Yazd Province

Populated places in Yazd County